Martial d'Auvergne (Martial of Auvergne, Martial of Paris, 1420 – 13 May 1508) was a French poet.
Originally from Auvergne, he served as  notary at Châtelet, and later as  attorney (procureur) for the Paris parlement.

His most important work is the  Vigiles de Charles VII à neuf psaumes et neuf leçons (1493, edited 1724), a versified chronicle of the Hundred Years' War. It was composed between 1477 and 1483, with the first manuscript completed in 1484 and the first edition printed in 1493.

His other works include  Les Louenges de la benoiste Vierge Marie (1492), a devotional poem dedicated to Mary, mother of Jesus and the satirical  Les Arrêts d’amour (undated, in prose) and  L’Amant rendu cordelier à l’Observance d’amour (1490, in verse).

See also
Gilles d'Aurigny

References

 Charles Bataillard, Martial de Paris, dit Martial d'Auvergne. Notice sur sa vie et ses ouvrages, A. Hardel, Caen, 1862.
 Gérard Gros, Martial d'Auvergne et les Matines de la Vierge : étude sur les formes de la dévotion mariale au temps de Louis XI, 1994.

External links

 
 

1420 births
1508 deaths
French poets
French male poets